"Ameagari ni mita Maboroshi" (A vision seen after a rain) is the 29th single by the pillows, released on September 2, 2009. It appears on their 20th album OOPArts (2009). It reached number 7 on the Oricon Weekly Singles Chart.

Tracks 
 Ameagari ni mita Maboroshi (雨上がりに見た幻)
 Fighting Pose (ファイティングポーズ)

Chart performance

References

Ameagari Ni Mita Maboroshi - Review by Adam Greenberg (AllMusic.com)
"Ameagari ni mita Maboroshi" at official the pillows site.

2009 singles
The Pillows songs
2009 songs
Avex Trax singles